Charles Sikubwabo is a Rwandan fugitive war criminal wanted for his role in the 1994 Rwandan genocide. He served as mayor of Gishyita commune, Kibuye prefecture, from 1993 till July 1994. According to the indictment against him, Sikubwabo played an instrumental role in the murder of Tutsis in the Kibuye region during the genocide, including personally participating in killings. During this period, in contact with Clement Kayishema, Obed Ruzindana, and Aloys Ndimbati, amongst others, he facilitated the murders of Tutsis who sought refuge in the Bisesero hills. He is believed to be in the eastern Democratic Republic of Congo today.

See also
 List of fugitives from justice who disappeared

References

Fugitives wanted by Rwanda
Living people
People indicted by the International Criminal Tribunal for Rwanda
Year of birth missing (living people)